Romanian National Opera may refer to a number of national opera and ballet companies in Romania:

Romanian National Opera, Bucharest
Romanian National Opera, Cluj-Napoca
Romanian National Opera, Iași
Romanian National Opera, Timișoara